Purshia tridentata, with the common name bitterbrush, is a  shrub in the genus Purshia of the family Rosaceae. It is native to mountainous areas of western North America.

Common names include antelope bitterbrush, antelope bush, buckbrush, quinine brush, and less commonly deerbrush, blackbrush, and greasewood. Some of these names are shared with other species.

Description 
It has many branches and slender green, three- to five-lobed leaves 5–20 millimetres long. It is a nitrogen-fixing plant.

The flowers are pale yellow, with five petals 6–8 mm long, and darker yellow anthers. The fruit is a cluster of dry, slender, leathery achenes 0.6–2 centimetres long.

Varieties
There are two named varieties of the species:
Purshia tridentata var. glandulosa — Eastern Sierra Nevada, Southern California
Purshia tridentata var. tridentata

Distribution 
The plant is found from southeastern British Columbia in the north, east to Montana and Wyoming, south to New Mexico, and west in California. It grows on arid mountainsides and slopes, as well as rocky or drained soils with somewhat more moisture than the sagebrush steppe. It is often associated with Balsamorhiza as well as Wyethia species, and in southern areas hybridizes with Purshia stansburyana.

Uses
The shrub is an important forage plant for many game animals, including deer, especially during the winter.

References

External links
Central Washington Native Plants: Antelope bitterbrush
Range Plants of Utah: Purshia tridentata (Antelope bitterbrush)

tridentata
Flora of the Northwestern United States
Flora of the Southwestern United States
Flora of British Columbia
Flora of California
Flora of New Mexico
Flora of Wyoming
Flora of the Cascade Range
Flora of the Great Basin
Flora of the Rocky Mountains
Flora of the Sierra Nevada (United States)
Natural history of the Peninsular Ranges
Taxa named by Augustin Pyramus de Candolle
Flora without expected TNC conservation status